Wołczyn may refer to:

 Wołczyn, a town in the Opole Voivodship, Poland
 Wołczyn, West Pomeranian Voivodeship (north-west Poland)
 Wołczyn, Polish spelling of Voŭčyn (Воўчын), a village in Belarus